Salmour is a comune (municipality) in the Province of Cuneo in the Italian region Piedmont, located about  south of Turin and about  northeast of Cuneo.  
Salmour borders the following municipalities: Bene Vagienna, Cervere, Cherasco, Fossano, and Narzole.

References

Cities and towns in Piedmont

lmo:Salmour